L'imitateur is a 1982 Belgian documentary short film written and directed by Jaco Van Dormael. The short film was shot in 1982 in Belgium. L'imitateur tells the story of two mentally disabled which do a brief intrusion into the world of "normal people". The film was awarded the Best Documentary and Best Short Film at the 1983 Brussels Film Festival. In 2011, it appeared at the Sottodiciotto Filmfestival held in Turin in the retrospective dedicated to Van Dormael.

References

External links

1982 films
1982 short films
Belgian short documentary films
1980s Swedish-language films
Films directed by Jaco Van Dormael
1980s short documentary films
1982 documentary films
Documentary films about people with disability
Documentary films about mental health